Czarnia may refer to:

 Czarnia (comics), a fictional home-planet of DC Comics character Lobo
 Czarnia, Gmina Czarnia in Masovian Voivodeship (east-central Poland)
 Czarnia, Gmina Kadzidło in Masovian Voivodeship (east-central Poland)